The rolling stock used on the Isle of Man Railway today is entirely original although, from an original total of 75 carriages, the number serviceable dropped as low as 14, but this total is once again increasing as a result of recent rebuilds  The 3 ft (914 mm) gauge railway was provided with a variety of stock from different manufacturers over its time, and types of coach were categorised according to a lettering system, with the original four-wheeled coaches being of A, B, C and D types, and so on. The F prefix encompassed all bogie vehicles including conversions from the A-D series. Letters G-M denoted goods stock. N referred to ex-Manx Northern Railway 6 wheel carriages. The types of stock can be summarised as follows:-

Four-Wheeled Coaches (1873-1874)

Four-wheeled carriages supplied for the opening of the line to Peel in 1873; these were close-coupled in pairs from the late 1880s. Each class of coach had a different internal layout. Class "A" consisted of twelve first class carriages - eleven three-compartment carriages and one saloon. The "B" class consisted of 24 three-compartment third class carriages open above the seat backs. The "C" class (14 built) had two third class compartments and a brake compartment - one coach was later converted to a saloon. The "D" class consisted of a pair of composites arranged 3/1/3, the first class compartment being wider at the expense of the third class passengers. All these were later converted into bogie carriages by mounting pairs of bodies on bogie underframes supplied by the Metropolitan Carriage & Wagon Co. They became known as the "pairs" coaches and were later renumbered into the F.50-F.75 series, see below.

"Small F" Coaches (1876-1896)

The initial batch were supplied by Brown Marshalls and became known as the "Small Fs" as they are noticeably smaller in size than the later vehicles being 35 feet long and 9'6" from rail to roof; all had wooden frames and had the frames concealed by the lower panelling of the carriage bodies, though at various periods where the frames would normally show was indicated with a broad black stripe at the bottom of the lower panels to match later carriages, this feature was reinstated in 2013.  Coaches listed with "Guard" in the layout above had a handbrake fitted in a locking housing in one of the end compartments.  In addition to the handbrake a lookout window was cut in the end of carriage.  This made it possible for a brakeman to ride in this compartment and provide additional braking on heavier trains in the days before continuous vacuum brake.  F.19 and F.20 were the first two "half luggage vans" delivered to the railway, half of the carriage being occupied with three third class compartments and the other half by a luggage compartment complete with guard's look-out duckets.

The Empress Vans (1897)

Two vehicles were supplied to the railway in 1897 and became known as the Empress Vans to acknowledge the fact that the year of delivery was Queen Victoria's jubilee year. These are the same length as the passenger vehicles but are entirely closed with no windows, but they have guard's lookout duckets attached; their busy careers have seen them in use as an ambulance train in conjunction with the T.T. and Manx Grand Prix races held annually on the island. They were stored for a number of years outdoors but despite this remain on the railway, having last been used in the 1992.

The Saloons (1905)
The amalgamation of the Manx Northern Railway into the I.M.R. in 1905 led to an urgent need to buy more carriages so that the Manx Northern's cramped six-wheelers could be removed from front line service.  Like all of the later carriages of the "F" class, the saloons were supplied by the Metropolitan Carriage & Wagon Company (who had absorbed Brown, Marshalls in 1902). The sequence begins with F.29 in 1905. They were the first to be built with wooden bodies on steel underframes, and are 37' 0" long and 10'3" from rail to roof. All survive today; F.35,1 F.31 and F.32 were converted in 1980 to form the Bar Set at which time half the seating was removed from F.35 and a small bar and chemical toilet fitted, also through gangways to the adjoining coaches. Later, as F.31 was withdrawn for major bodywork attention, F.29 was fitted with a corridor and replaced the former vehicle. The saloons have remained unpopular with locomotive crews as they are heavy yet do not carry as many passengers as the standard compartment stock.  Sketches survive which show that some consideration was given to building these carriages as Saloons with a large brake-luggage compartment.  As of February 2015, all saloons with the exception of F.36 have been fitted with corridor connections to form a full dining train with F.27 (ii) at the rear providing the kitchen facilities and generator.
8

The Hurst Nelsons (1899)
These were the first two bogie vehicles built for the Manx Northern Railway; they were the first passenger vehicles on steel underframes to enter service on the island's railway network, as well as the first to have electric lighting.  They were purchased to act as through coaches to Douglas.  Externally they are not terribly different from the other "Big Fs", together with the Foxdale Coach they were allocated numbers in the "F" class upon take-over in 1905. Remaining stock inherited from the Manx Northern Railway was either given the "N" prefix, or, in the case of non-passenger stock, a small "r" was added to the title, as explained below.  In 2022 the carriages both returned to railway ownership.

The Foxdale Coach (1887)

Yet another oddity is this carriage, this time originating from the Foxdale Railway. It was built by the Oldbury Railway Carriage and Wagon Co in 1886 for the small branch to Foxdale; this is a true survivor of the system and is still in operation today. It is the smallest bogie carriage on the system being only 30' 0" long, and rides on plate frame bogies.  As constructed it had four third class compartments and a small luggage and guard's compartment complete with lookout duckets, which took up a little over a third of the length of the vehicle.  One of the compartments was converted into a first class section, which led to the carriage acquiring the nickname Kitto's Coach after the Captain of the Foxdale Mines who had a first class free pass on the Manx Northern.  It was converted into a camping coach in 1967 and painted into a non-typical blue and yellow livery. In 1979 to mark the occasion of the centenary of the Manx Northern Railway, it was painted into original livery and re-numbered No. 15 for a spell, before reverting to fleet livery of purple lake and regaining the fleet number F.39.  She carried the red and cream livery from 1999 until 2013 when the coach was repainted into the Manx Northern Railway livery and renumbered M.N.Ry. No. 17.  The first class compartment was also reinstated at this time reducing the seating capacity by two seats as armrests were provided. It was withdrawn at the end of the 2021 season and the bogies removed for attention, the carriage will also undergo a full repaint retaining the purple lake scheme.

"Large F" Coaches (1905-1926)

Built to the same larger profile as the saloons, those that remain still provide the backbone of the service fleet today in everyday service and have rarely been out of traffic since their arrival on the island. They all now carry the standard red and cream livery.

The "Pairs" (1909-1926)
To simplify the marshalling of trains and reduce their overall length, the original four-wheeled stock was close coupled in pairs from 1887 onwards.  This involved removing the chopper couplers from one end of each vehicle and replacing them with conventional side buffers on one carriage and rubbing plates on the other. A link and pin coupling then joined the inner ends of the carriages whilst conventional chopper couplings were retained on the outer ends of the each pair.

A further development of this policy occurred between 1909 and 1926 when the bodies of the four wheel coaches were removed from their original chassis and mounted in pairs on to bogie underframes supplied by Metropolitan. By the late 1950s, relatively few were used in regular service, but two sets were reserved for schools traffic.  These were used in regular service on exceptionally busy days, such as Tynwald Day, but otherwise were confined to the school runs. By this time they were painted in a utilitarian all-over brown colour scheme. Oddly, several of the pairs were rehabilitated in the early 1970s, as their steel frames were of relatively recent date.  Surviving pairs carriages are mostly in poor condition, as their bodies date from 1873–75, and have been surrounded by a certain amount of controversy in recent years, having been removed from the railway for storage. The Isle of Man Steam Railway Supporters' Association have campaigned for their retention on the railway. Some are now in the carriage sheds at Douglas and Port Erin, four in open storage at Port St. Mary protected with tarpaulins.

"N" Six-Wheel Coaches (1879)
Cleminson's patent enjoyed a brief vogue in the late 1870s as an alternative to bogie carriages mainly due to its low tare weight. The Southwold Railway which opened the same year as the Manx Northern also used Cleminson's patent underframes from its passenger stock, and also for some high capacity freight wagons. The North Wales Narrow Gauge, and West Donegal Railways also used the system on coaches, and a Cleminson wagon survives on the Festiniog. Two of the Manx Northern "N" class carriages were built as firsts; two as composites; and ten as either third class or third-brake carriages. The first class carriages were arranged as three small saloons and seated 42. The third class carriages must have been quite cramped internally as the compartments were only 4'10" wide - ten inches less than was the case with the IMR bogie carriages. Both of the composites and about half of the third class carriages were built with handbrake wheel in an end compartment that could be locked away when not in use and the compartment used for passengers. Two of the third class carriages were damaged in minor collisions, or suffered underframe failure before the Manx Northern was taken over by the Isle of Man Railway. Twelve of the class passed to the IMR's ownership in 1905. J.I.C. Boyd (The Isle of Man Railway Oakwood Press, 1967) states that the original intention was to number them into the "F" series, hence the numbers 40 to 51, but as they were six-wheelers the decision was made to give them the prefix "N" - the next available letter in the IMR's coding system - to distinguish them from the bogie carriages. Photographs suggest that at least some of the "N" series carriages remained in service in the 1920s and 30s. It is not sure when they fell into disuse. For many years they were stored in a siding behind St. John's station carriage shed. The body of one of the "N" class carriages survives on the line today as the mess hut at Douglas station. This body came from N.41 and was placed in front of the locomotive shed in 1964 replacing another former six wheeler. Between 1999 and 2013 it was stored on a runner behind the carriage shed at Douglas, but it has now returned to its former position, has been partly restored, and is used as an oil store. Another - composite carriage N.42 - was a resident of the Port Erin museum until it was rebuilt in 1998 when it was placed in store. It was not returned to the completed museum, but, despite being owned privately, it remained on the railway until finally removed (in the face of much objection) to Southwold in 2013. A third is in private preservation in the north of the island together with a Beyer Peacock locomotive, No. 14 Thornhill (Ex-Manx Northern). Of the other ten carriages, one was withdrawn in 1903, a second in 1905, and a third in the 1920s. This was used as a Mess Room at Douglas Station and was later replaced by the body of N.41, the other eight were scrapped, some after being damaged in a fire in 1975 which also destroyed most of the 1876 batch of wooden bogie carriages.

"E" Class Brake Vans (1873-1895)

These were four-wheeled brake and luggage vans fitted with lookout duckets, but otherwise entirely sealed with only two drop-sash windows at the guard's door.  Originally, these vans were intended to be capable of carrying ten passengers in a single compartment, according to Metropolitan's original drawings (conjecturally shown adjacent), but this was never carried out. None of these vans survive today, and they were effectively made redundant when later passenger coaches had their own braking systems. The primary purpose of the "E" van was to provide luggage accommodation and braking for the original "A" - "D" class most of which did not have their own brakes when supplied in 1873/4. One surviving member of the class sat at the end of the Port Erin arrival platform at Douglas for many years and retained its pre-war two-tone brown livery. The Manx Northern Railway owned a pair of similar vans for use with the "N" class carriages, but these seem to have been replaced in the 1890s and then used for goods traffic until they were scrapped in the 1920s.  The possibility of the Isle of Man Steam Railway Supporters' Association recreating one of these vehicles has been mooted in the past but never reached fruition.

"G" Closed Vans (1873-1921)

These were four-wheeled closed vans, quite often these were attached to the rear of a passenger train to transport goods to the rural communities that the railway served for many years. Upon amalgamation with the Manx Northern Railway in 1905 five were inherited. Today, there remain three in existence, all of which remain on the railway, these are G.1, of the original 1873 batch, Gr.12, (the small "r" prefix denoting that it is ex-Manx Northern stock) and G.19 which saw use for many years by the permanent way crews, distinctive for being fitted with clambour boards for tree felling, and having a small wood stove installed, these were removed for its display in the museum during 2013.  Nine of the class were sold for scrap in the infamous Ballasalla Bonfire of 1974 together with many other items of redundant non-passenger stock.  In 2017 the Isle of Man Steam Railway Supporters' Association announced plans to fully restore the sole surviving 1873 vehicle G.1 to service.

"H" Three-Plank Wagons (1873-1925)

Twenty of these 6-ton three-plank, centre door, open wagons were built for the opening of the Peel and Port Erin lines in 1873 and 1874.  A dozen similar vehicles were delivered to the Manx Northern Railway when it opened in 1879, and further small batches brought the total to 46 by 1926. One of these wagons was used (with suitable side rails attached) to carry the military band to Peel on opening day in 1873. The Isle of Man Steam Railway Supporters' Association built one of these from scratch in 2000. It has been given the number H.1, and has been through piped for vacuum brakes to meet with current safety regulations. This was the second project undertaken by the supporters, the first being the re-building of a ballast wagon M.78.

"K" Cattle Vans (1873-1926)

These were cattle carrying wagons, and were ostensibly similar to the "G" class as above but rather than being completely sealed, the top quarter of them was ventilated and featured horizontal rails where the "G" vans had only ventilated slots. The first batch were delivered for the opening of the Peel Line in 1873, with some early versions being delivered roofless. None survive today but it has been mooted, for historical purposes, that the Isle of Man Steam Railway Supporters' Association may take on the reconstruction of one of these, so that the railway ultimately has an example of each type of stock in their possession.

"L" Bolster Wagons (1874-1910)

The railway had six of these four-wheel vehicles which saw use carrying long loads commonly being used in pairs; each had manual parking brakes and they survived until the final years of the railway largely out of use latterly.  All had a grey livery on woodwork and black metal and frames, they were numbered along their edges.

"M" Two-Plank Wagons (1877-1926)

Two plank, drop sided wagons, broadly similar to the "H" class. They were intended as Ballast Wagons but their ease of loading and unloading made them useful for many types of goods traffic, eventually totalling 78 of these wagons on the line.  Three were leased as private owner wagons to the Mona Chemical Company in Peel. Other private owner wagons possibly existed. At least six were still serviceable in 1975, and a couple survived into nationalisation. M.70 was resident on the old goods siding at Santon Station for many years. M.78 also survived and it was this vehicle that inspired the Isle of Man Steam Railway Supporters' Association to restore it in 1998. The "rebuilt" wagon is now part of the railway's historic fleet of vehicles and bears plaques denoting its origins. It is coupled to H.1 as the Troublesome Trucks each September for the Friends of Thomas event.

Breakdown Cranes
The railway possessed a total of three cranes, the first being delivered in readiness for the opening of the Peel Line in 1873; a third crane was converted for use on the railway and later became self-propelled but was generally only used for demonstration purposes before being sold privately.  Today all lifting on the railway is done by hired road cranes, notably when locomotives are turned as part of the annual event galas.

"R" Bogie Runners
In 1967 as part of a short-lived experiment to use the railway to carry container traffic, under the title of "Man-Tainor", a new "R" class was created as below using former 'Pairs' coach underframes, the bodies of which were removed and dumped in the goods yards at St. John's and Castletown; no stock carries this prefix today, the frames having been sold off in 1974 to the scrap dealer Manx Metals, the experiment having ceased in 1968.  The series letter and numbering were entirely unofficial, having been applied by a party of visiting enthusiasts. The numbers were applied in the order they found the vehicles, not in order of their former F numbers. The exact correspondence between R and F numbers in not known. R3 was converted to a rather unsatisfactory well wagon and was cut up by Manx Metals, but the remaining ten were purchased from MM by the Festiniog Railway where six have been used under new coaches and two as wagons.

Permanent way wagons
The railway still has a number of runners and these are based on the underframes of former coaches and stored mostly on the siding outside Douglas station on the former Peel Line which now acts as a stock siding. Today, these still carry their "F" class fleet number either painted on, or in some cases just in chalk. In 1975 F65 and F50 frames were seen numbered as R12 and R13, but they later reverted to their F numbers.

Fish Wagons (1909-1914)

Five low-sided wagons were built on four-wheeled underframes released from coaches which had been put on bogie underframes ("pairs" coaches). They were numbered in a separate sequence with no letter prefix. They did not survive into the nationalisation era although some excellent photographs of them appear in the many books dedicated to the railway's history and rolling stock. They were labelled "Fish Wagon" at the left-hand side and carried their nominal fleet numbers to the right.

Liveries
Carriages;

Isle of Man Railway-

1873-c.1885:
 Series A: Off-white upper panels: green lower panels. Yellow lining. 
 A.12-Duke's Saloon. As for A series but gilt lining.
 Series B-E. Chocolate brown; yellow lining.
 Bogie stock. Chocolate brown lower panels and off-white upper panels. Lettering, etc. gold shaded blue.

1886-1916:
All passenger stock now in bogie carriage livery (as above).

1917-1934:
Light brown upper window panels replace off-white. The dark brown and tan livery now resembles that of the L.&.Y.Railway. Certain stock in these colours lasted until the mid 1930s. From 1931 secondary carriage stock were painted in a utilitarian dark brown.

1923-1926 (New stock):
During these years new stock had white upper panels and lake lower panels. Lining was red and yellow.

1935-1939:
Most stock had off-white upper window and purple lake lower panels, similar to "L. &. N.W.R." colours. Remainder was in "L.&.Y.R." colours.

1940-1945:
Any repainting done was in dark brown.

1946-1973, Present:
Firstly all-over deep red. Latterly deep red with off-white window panels. Older stock that had not been repainted was still all brown. Since 1968 all service carriages have had cream (off-white) upper panels and red lower panels.

Manx Northern Railway- 

1879:
The Cleminson 6-wheel carriages were described as being "Polished Teak."

1899:
Bogie stock on the Manx Northern (e.g. the Hurst Nelsons and the Foxdale Coach) had "Chocolate lower and creamy white upper panels."

Goods Wagons;

Isle of Man Railway-

 Light grey woodwork. Black or grey ironwork. Lettering etc. (large characters) white shaded black; (small characters) white. Load and Tare were often painted on one or both ends, occasionally on sides. On the Manx Northern Railway wagons were originally dark brown, lettering M.N.R. white. Later they were as for the Isle of Man Railway.

See also 
 Isle of Man Railway stations
 Isle of Man Railway locomotives
 Isle of Man Railway level crossings and points of interest
 Isle of Man Steam Railway Supporters' Association

References

External links 
Isle Of Man Transport & Isle Of Man Railways Site
Isle Of Man Guide - Steam Railway

Railway lines in the Isle of Man
Heritage railways in the Isle of Man
Isle of Man Railway